The Saudi Broadcasting Authority (SBA), formerly Saudi Broadcasting Corporation (SBC) and the Broadcasting Services of the Kingdom of Saudi Arabia (BSKSA), is a governmental entity of Saudi Arabia, organized under the Ministry of Media.  BSKSA operates almost all broadcasting outlets in the Kingdom.

Television stations
Al Saudiya —   The first and official channel of the Kingdom of Saudi Arabia broadcasts three daily news briefings and as well as series and entertainment shows.
Al Ekhbariya —  The most important regional and international news
AlRiyadiya —    SPL League matches and the Saudi national team, as well as tournaments held in Saudi Arabia, such as the Spanish and Italian Super, and other events
 SBC — Entertainment, Sports, Drama, TV shows
Quran TV — live Stream from Masjid al-Haram
Sunnah TV  — live Stream from Masjid al-Nabawi

Radio stations
 Saudi General Program (AKA Riyadh Radio, إذاعة الرياض)
 Saudi Second Program (AKA Jeddah Radio, إذاعة جدة)
 Saudia Radio (راديو السعودية)
International Programs (الإذاعات الدولية السعودية)
 Holy Quran Radio (إذاعة القرآن الكريم)
 Nedaa Al-Islam Radio (إذاعة نداء الإسلام)
Military Radio (إذاعة الجيش السعودي)

References

External links

Television in Saudi Arabia
Television channels and stations established in 1962
Islamic radio stations
Saudi Arabian companies established in 1962